Vittoria Salvini (born 14 September 1965) is a former Italian female mountain runner, bronze medallist at the 2006 European Mountain Running Championships.

Biography
At individual senior level she won 5 medals with the national team) at the World Mountain Running Championships.

Team results
World Mountain Running Championships (5 medals)
 2002, 2005 (2)
 2006, 2007, 2008 (3)

National titles
Italian Mountain Running Championships
 2002, 2005, 2007 (3)

References

External links
 

1965 births
Living people
Italian female mountain runners